Christian Ivaldi (born 2 September 1938) is a French pianist.

Ivaldi was born in Paris. He studied at the Paris Conservatory with Jacques Février and took a Premier Prix in piano performance, as well as in chamber music, counterpoint, and accompaniment. He first appeared as a soloist at Radio France in 1961. He has premiered pieces by Gilbert Amy, Georges Aperghis, André Boucourechliev, Maurice Ohana, and Luis de Pablo among others. He is considered "a remarkable musician".

References

1938 births
Musicians from Paris
20th-century French male classical pianists
Living people
Conservatoire de Paris alumni
Academic staff of the École Normale de Musique de Paris